The Jiangkou Reservoir  is a large scale reservoir in Wulong County, Chongqing Municipality, People's Republic of China constructed for the primary purpose of generating hydroelectricity.

Built at a cost of 1.95 billion RMB, the reservoir's concrete hyperbolic arch dam in Jiankou Town (江口镇)  from the confluence of the Wu and Furong Rivers houses a hydroelectric power plant with an installed capacity of 300 MW.

References

Reservoirs in China
Bodies of water of Chongqing